Koichi Ishimori (born 2 December 1961) is a Japanese wrestler. He competed in the men's freestyle +100 kg at the 1984 Summer Olympics.

References

1961 births
Living people
Japanese male sport wrestlers
Olympic wrestlers of Japan
Wrestlers at the 1984 Summer Olympics
Sportspeople from Osaka
20th-century Japanese people